The Thomas Alva Edison silver dollar is a commemorative silver dollar issued by the United States Mint in 2004. It portrays American inventor Thomas Edison.

Legislation 
The Thomas Alva Edison Commemorative Coin Act authorized the production of a silver dollar to commemorate the life of Edison and the 125th anniversary of the invention of the light bulb.  The act allowed the coins to be struck in both proof and uncirculated finishes.

Design
The obverse of the coin, designed by Donna Weaver, features a portrait of Edison holding an early experimental light bulb in his laboratory. The reverse, designed by John Mercanti, features a rendering of Edison's first light bulb.

See also

 List of United States commemorative coins and medals (2000s)
 United States commemorative coins

References

2004 establishments in the United States
Modern United States commemorative coins
Thomas Edison
Silver coins